"Marta" is the third official single from Nena Daconte's debut album He Perdido Los Zapatos. It charted No.16 in Nielsen ratings in 2005. The band made two videos. The first with a borrowed white Golf GTI convertible, later, with better resources under Universal, refilming the video with a red Ford Mustang.

Charts

References

Nena Daconte songs
2005 songs
Song articles with missing songwriters